The following is the list of 49 stations on the Nuremberg U-Bahn:

References